Yuriy Teterenko (born 22 January 1997) is a professional Ukrainian football midfielder.

Career 
Teterenko is a product of Youth Sport School #2 and FC Volyn Youth Sportive School Systems. In 2012 he signed a professional contract with FC Volyn Lutsk in the Ukrainian Premier League.

He made his debut in the Ukrainian Premier League for FC Volyn on 13 August 2016, playing in a match against FC Zirka Kropyvnytskyi.

In August 2018 he became member of Lithuanian FK Atlantas Klaipėda and play in A lyga.

References

External links

Living people
1997 births
Ukrainian footballers
Association football midfielders
Ukrainian expatriate footballers
Expatriate footballers in Lithuania
Expatriate footballers in Belarus
Ukrainian Premier League players
FC Volyn Lutsk players
FK Atlantas players
FC Slutsk players
SC Tavriya Simferopol players
Ukrainian expatriate sportspeople in Belarus
Footballers from Lutsk